The Czech Republic competed at the 2006 Winter Olympics in Turin, Italy.
Speed skater Martina Sáblíková served as flag bearer at the opening ceremonies. The medal hopes were set on ice hockey team, Jakub Janda in ski jumping, Kateřina Neumannová in cross-country skiing and on Sáblíková. As for hockey team, the bronze medal was less than most of Czech fans awaited before the olympic, and more than they hoped for after the group stage. But the strongest moment for Czech sport fans was unbelievable finish of Kateřina Neumannová in cross-country skiing, where she on the last meters of 30 km run got from the third to first position. It was her last Olympic start and it was finally a gold one, and the view of her little daughter running to her as the first to congratulate will be a lasting moment of Turin 2006.

Medalists

Alpine skiing 

Men

Women

Note: In the men's combined, run 1 is the downhill, and runs 2 and 3 are the slalom. In the women's combined, run 1 and 2 are the slalom, and run 3 the downhill.

Biathlon 

Men

Women

Bobsleigh

Cross-country skiing 

Distance

Men

Women

Sprint

Figure skating 

Key: CD = Compulsory Dance, FD = Free Dance, FS = Free Skate, OD = Original Dance, SP = Short Program

Freestyle skiing

Ice hockey

Men's tournament

Players

Round-robin

Medal round

Quarterfinal

Semifinal

Bronze medal game

Luge

Nordic combined 

Note: 'Deficit' refers to the amount of time behind the leader a competitor began the cross-country portion of the event. Italicized numbers show the final deficit from the winner's finishing time.

Short track speed skating

Ski jumping 

Note: PQ indicates a skier was pre-qualified for the final, based on entry rankings.

Snowboarding 

Halfpipe

Note: In the final, the single best score from two runs is used to determine the ranking. A bracketed score indicates a run that wasn't counted.

Parallel GS

Key: '+ Time' represents a deficit; the brackets indicate the results of each run.

Snowboard Cross

Speed skating

References

 olympic.cz - Czech Olympic Committee
 

Nations at the 2006 Winter Olympics
2006
Winter Olympics